Kenji Nakamura (中村 健治 Nakamura Kenji; born March 25, 1970) is a Japanese anime director. He is best known for directing the critically acclaimed anime series Mononoke, [C]: Control, Tsuritama and Gatchaman Crowds.

Career
After graduating from university, Nakamura worked as a salaryman for several years before entering the anime industry at Toei Animation. Originally an animator, he quit due to tendinitis and instead worked his way up the production process to become a director. He has since moved on to be a freelance director.

In March 2021, Twin Engine announced they were working with Nakamura on a new original anime, codenamed Yotogi

Notable works

TV productions
Kindaichi Case Files (1998, production assistance)
Shinzo (2000, assistant director)
The SoulTaker (2001, episode director)
Yobarete Tobidete Akubi-chan (2002, episode director)
The Big O (2003, episode director)
Ayakashi: Samurai Horror Tales (2006, storyboard, episode director)
Kemonozume (2006, script, storyboard, episode director)
Mononoke (2007, series director)
Hakaba Kitarō (2008, storyboard and unit director for OP, ED)
Trapeze (2009, series director)
C - Control (2011, series director)
Tsuritama (2012, series director)
Gatchaman Crowds (2013, series director)
Gatchaman Crowds Insight (2015, series director)

OVA
Karas (2005, storyboard, episode director)
Iriya no Sora, UFO no Natsu (2005, storyboard, unit director)

Films
Digimon: Diaboromon Strikes Back (2001, assistant director)
untitled Mononoke film (TBA, director)

ONA
Transformers: Combiner Wars (2016, director)

References

External links 
 
 Kenji Nakamura at Media Arts DB 

1970 births
Living people
Anime directors
People from Gifu Prefecture